Adalatherium (meaning "crazy beast") is an extinct gondwanatherian that lived on Madagascar during the Cretaceous period, during the Maastrichtian. The discovery of the first nearly-complete Adalatherium skeleton from the Maevarano Formation was announced in April 2020.

While typical mammals found from that era were around the size of a mouse, the skeleton found — thought to merely be a juvenile — was 60 cm (2 ft) long. It is depicted in reconstructions as being built somewhat like a badger. Its skeleton is the most complete of any Southern Hemisphere Mesozoic mammal. Additionally, the front of the skull contains more foramina than any known mammal.

References

Gondwanatheres
Late Cretaceous mammals
Maastrichtian life
Cretaceous Madagascar
Fossils of Madagascar
Maevarano fauna
Fossil taxa described in 2020
Taxa named by David W. Krause
Taxa named by Simone Hoffmann
Taxa named by Yaoming Hu
Taxa named by John R. Wible
Taxa named by Guillermo W. Rougier
Taxa named by E. Christopher Kirk
Taxa named by Joseph R. Groenke
Taxa named by Raymond R. Rogers
Taxa named by James B. Rossie
Taxa named by Julia A. Schultz
Taxa named by Alistair R. Evans
Taxa named by Wighart von Koenigswald
Taxa named by Lydia J. Rahantarisoa